This is the list of Indian films that were released in 2022.

Box office collection 
The list of highest-grossing Indian films released in 2022, by worldwide box office gross revenue, are as follows:

Lists of Indian films of 2022 
 
List of Hindi films of 2022
List of Malayalam films of 2022                                                        
List of Tamil films of 2022
List of Telugu films of 2022
List of Kannada films of 2022
List of Marathi films of 2022
List of Punjabi films of 2022
List of Gujarati films of 2022
List of Tulu films of 2022
List of Indian Bengali films of 2022

Notes

References

2022
India